Elaheh Rastgou is an Iranian conservative-minded reformist politician who was formerly a member of City Council of Tehran and a Member of Parliament.

Career 
Rastgou entered Islamic Consultative Assembly's 5th term in Malayer's 1997 by-election, defeating the incumbent Hassan Zamanifar. She was a sympathizer of Executives of Construction fraction at the time. 
In 2000 elections, she ran for a seat in Tehran, Rey, Shemiranat and Eslamshahr as Freethinkers' Pinnacle Party's candidate and was defeated. Backed by reformist 'Coalition For Iran', she was defeated in 2004 from the same district. In 2008 parliamentary elections, she lost again while listed in both Islamic Iran Participation Front and National Trust Party endorsing lists.

She lost 2003 and 2006 elections of City Council of Tehran, but eventually won a seat in 2013 while being supported by reformists coalition.

2013 allegiance switch 
A sudden switch of allegiance by Rastgou, reformist-backed member of the Tehran City Council, helped Mohammad Bagher Ghalibaf to retain his seat by a vote margin of one. Following the vote, she was 'fired' from Islamic Labour Party because allegedly 'breaking her oath to vote for the reformist mayor'.

In 2017, she officially joined the conservative alliance Popular Front of Islamic Revolution Forces.

Electoral history

References

Living people
People from Malayer
1962 births
Iranian reformists
Members of the 5th Islamic Consultative Assembly
Islamic Labour Party politicians
Summit of Freethinkers Party politicians
Members of the Women's fraction of Islamic Consultative Assembly
Tehran Councillors 2013–2017
Popular Front of Islamic Revolution Forces politicians
Iranian politicians who have crossed the floor